The white monjita (Xolmis irupero) is a species of bird in the family Tyrannidae, the tyrant flycatchers. It is found in Brazil, in regions of Caatinga and Pantanal. It is also found in the Paraguay, Argentina, Bolivia, and Uruguay.
Its natural habitats are subtropical or tropical dry shrubland and heavily degraded former forest.

This is a bright white bird, with dark eyes, black legs, and a medium to short pointed bill. It has deep black borders on the outer wing, and a short notched tail.

References

External links
White monjita videos on the Internet Bird Collection
Stamps (for Paraguay) with ~RangeMap
White monjita photo gallery VIREO Photo-High Res
Photo-High Res; Article tropicalbirding–"Northwest Argentina"

white monjita
Birds of Brazil
Birds of the Pantanal
Birds of the Caatinga
Birds of Bolivia
Birds of Argentina
Birds of the South Region
Birds of Paraguay
Birds of Uruguay
white monjita
Taxa named by Louis Jean Pierre Vieillot
Taxonomy articles created by Polbot